Elise Mertens was the defending champion, but lost in the quarterfinals to Maria Sakkari.

Sakkari went on to win her first WTA Tour title, defeating Johanna Konta in the final, 2–6, 6–4, 6–1. Sakkari became the first Greek player to win a WTA title since Eleni Daniilidou in Hobart in 2008.

Seeds

Draw

Finals

Top half

Bottom half

Qualifying

Seeds

Qualifiers

Lucky loser

Draw

First qualifier

Second qualifier

Third qualifier

Fourth qualifier

References

External Links
 Main Draw
 Qualifying Draw

Grand Prix SAR La Princesse Lalla Meryem - Singles
2019 Singles
2019 in Moroccan tennis